Aleksei Akimovich Bespalikov (27 March 1948 – 30 April 2021) was a Russian politician. He served on the Legislative Assembly of Novosibirsk Oblast from 2005 to 2010 and the Federation Council of Russia from 2010 to 2014.

References

1948 births
2021 deaths
Russian politicians
Members of the Federation Council of Russia (after 2000)
Politicians from Novosibirsk